The Finnish Government is the executive branch and cabinet of Finland, which directs the politics of Finland and is the main source of legislation proposed to the Parliament. The Government has collective ministerial responsibility and represents Finland in the Council of the European Union. In the incumbent Marin Cabinet, the Government comprises 19 ministers leading 12 ministries.

Majority coalition governments have become the foundation of the Finnish Government; apart from a few historical exceptions, a Government is usually assembled by the representatives of two major parties and a number of smaller parties.

Composition 
The Government is the most important executive body of Finland composed of the ministers. Its supreme powers are based on Section 3, Chapter 1 of the Constitution of Finland (and the subordinate Government Act of 2003):The governmental powers are exercised by the President of the Republic and the Government, the members of which
shall have the confidence of the Parliament.

Cabinet and ministers
The Government is led by the Prime Minister, considered practically the most powerful single office holder in Finland and often the leader of the largest political party.

The Government is composed of 11 ministries plus the Prime Minister's Office. Each ministry is led by at least one minister. Unlike the varying number and portfolios of ministers, the number and names of the ministries are fixed in law. All ministers sit in the Government.

The Government itself proposes the number of ministers and their roles for the Parliament of Finland to confirm, and it is possible to reshuffle portfolios during the life of a Government. There are no senior or junior ministers, and ministers without portfolio are no longer permitted under the 2000 constitution. Ministers are not required to be Members of Parliament (MPs), although they often are. Each minister is assisted by a secretary of state, a political appointee who serves at the pleasure of the minister.

Although ministers' portfolios are divided among the participating political parties, the Government has collective ministerial responsibility, and the ministers are expected to follow a government programme agreed upon during government formation talks.

List of the ministries

Ministerial committees 
The Prime Minister may sit with a subset of the Government in a ministerial committee (cabinet committee), when it is not necessary or desirable to have the entire Government convene. There are government-specific and optional ministerial committees in addition to the four statutory ministerial committees:
 Ministerial Finance Committee;
 Ministerial Committee on Foreign and Security Policy (officially since 1922 and unofficially before that);
 Ministerial Committee on Economic Policy (officially since 1977 and unofficially before that); and
 Ministerial Committee on European Union Affairs (established in 1995 to replace the Ministerial Committee on European Economic Community Affairs).

Legislation 

The Government initiates the majority of legislation. A proposed act is drafted in the respective ministry under the direction of its minister, after which it is reviewed by the Government and forwarded as a government proposal to Parliament for processing and possible amendments. However, since coalition governments have become the norm in Finland, the parties represented in the Government usually form the majority in the parliament, making the process somewhat more harmonious. Since 1957, all governments have been majority governments. Before a proposal is enacted into law, it must be confirmed by the President of Finland. As such, the president has the power of a delaying veto as a check against majority politics and potential violations of international agreements. Periods of cohabitation, wherein the president and the government represent different political positions, can create strife. The president's veto can be overridden by the Parliament, although this is in practice not done. Parties can also agree to not to vote along party lines but to leave the decision to individual MPs, although this is uncommon.

While the Parliament passes acts, the Government or an individual ministry issues decrees as delegated legislation. Decrees clarify, specify, and guide the implementation of an act of Parliament, but cannot contradict it. They are similar to US standing executive orders. A typical example is specifying the actual monetary sums for benefits described in general terms in an act. Decrees form an important body of law alongside acts of Parliament.

Budget 
State funds can be spent only in the framework of the state budget, which must be confirmed by Parliament. The Government drafts the annual budget and introduces it to Parliament for discussion and approval. If the Government requires more funds mid-year, they have to submit an additional budget proposal to Parliament. For 2018, the central state budget was €55.8 billion, not including municipal budgets and non-departmental bodies like state-owned enterprises.

Incumbent government 

The current Marin cabinet is Finland's 76th Government, which was inaugurated on 10 December 2019. It consists of 19 ministers and 5 parties: Social Democratic Party, Centre Party, Green League, Left Alliance and Swedish People's Party.

Ministers 

The incumbent 19 ministers and their associated portfolios are listed below.

|}

List of governments
The following is a list of all Finnish governments since 1917.

See also
Politics of Finland
Diet of Finland
Finnish Civil War

References

External links 
 
 Finnish Government Termbank Valter

Cabinets of Finland
Finnish Government
Politics of Finland
Finland politics-related lists